Breach is a video game published in 1987 by Omnitrend Software.  It was followed by Breach 2 in 1990 and Breach 3 in 1995.

Release
A conversion for Sega Genesis featuring the gameplay-system improvements from the Amiga version of Breach 2 was in development by Treco but it was never released.

Reception
Joseph S. McMaster reviewed the game for Computer Gaming World, and stated that "In spite of occasional problems with the documentation, Breach must be considered a top-notch game."

Harvey Bernstein for Antic stated "Hardcore wargamers will probably find Breach's variations on old themes intriguing, but for the rest of us this ST game just isn't much fun."

Keith Ferrell for Compute! stated "This game captures perfectly the feel of those hard-combat, high-tech science-fiction war stories."

Reviews
Atari ST User - Sep, 1989
ACE (Advanced Computer Entertainment) - May, 1989
ASM (Aktueller Software Markt) - May, 1988
Computer Gaming World - Nov, 1992

References

External links
Review in Info

1987 video games
Amiga games
Atari ST games
Cancelled Sega Genesis games
Classic Mac OS games
DOS games
Role-playing video games
Science fiction video games
Strategy video games
Tactical role-playing video games
Turn-based tactics video games
Video games developed in the United States